Nail is an unincorporated community in Newton County, Arkansas, United States.

The origin of the name "Nail" is obscure.
On the origins of the name: Nail sits on top of a mountain. When first settled it was called Hickory Grove. Later it was changed to Nail because everyone in the area would go to the store there to buy nails. Ref/ Norton and Watson family history. Both local families there. Note; The church and cemetery are still called Hickory Grove.

References

Unincorporated communities in Newton County, Arkansas
Unincorporated communities in Arkansas